Lissolo-Sobara is a village in north-eastern Ivory Coast. It is in the sub-prefecture of Bassawa, Dabakala Department, Hambol Region, Vallée du Bandama District. Lissolo-Sobara is located near the tripoint of the Vallée du Bandama, Lacs, and Zanzan Districts.

Lissolo-Sobara was a commune until March 2012, when it became one of 1126 communes nationwide that were abolished.

Notes

Former communes of Ivory Coast
Populated places in Vallée du Bandama District
Populated places in Hambol